Damien Tokatlian (born 5 January 1970) is a French wheelchair fencer. He won a medal at three editions of the Summer Paralympics. He won the silver medal in the men's team foil event at the 2012 Summer Paralympics in London, United Kingdom and the bronze medal in this event at the 2016 Summer Paralympics in Rio de Janeiro, Brazil. He also won the bronze medal in the men's team foil event at the 2020 Summer Paralympics held in Tokyo, Japan.

References

External links 
 

Living people
1970 births
Place of birth missing (living people)
French male foil fencers
Paralympic wheelchair fencers of France
Paralympic bronze medalists for France
Paralympic medalists in wheelchair fencing
Wheelchair fencers at the 2012 Summer Paralympics
Wheelchair fencers at the 2016 Summer Paralympics
Wheelchair fencers at the 2020 Summer Paralympics
Medalists at the 2012 Summer Paralympics
Medalists at the 2016 Summer Paralympics
Medalists at the 2020 Summer Paralympics